is a national highway connecting Mizunami, Gifu Prefecture and Maibara, Shiga Prefecture in Japan.

Route data
Length: 
Origin: Mizunami (originates at junction with Route 19)
Terminus: Maibara (ends at Junction with Route 8)
Major cities: Minokamo, Kakamigahara, Gifu, Ōgaki

History
4 December 1952 - Designation as First Class National Highway 21 (from Mizunami to Maibara)
1 April 1965 - Designation as General National Highway 21 (from Mizunami to Maibara)

Intersects with

Gifu Prefecture
Route 19
Route 248
Route 41
Routes 22 and 156
Route 157
Routes 258 and 417
Route 365
Shiga Prefecture
Route 8

References

021
Roads in Gifu Prefecture
Roads in Shiga Prefecture